Ipanema River is a river of Alagoas and Pernambuco states in eastern Brazil.

See also
List of rivers of Alagoas
List of rivers of Pernambuco

References
Brazilian Ministry of Transport

Rivers of Alagoas
Rivers of Pernambuco